Edinburgh Castle is a historic fortress in Edinburgh, Scotland.

Edinburgh Castle may also refer to:

 Edinburgh Castle, Jamaica, a plantation house
 , an ocean liner
 , an ocean liner